Lawyers Bar (also, Sawyers Bar) was a settlement in Klamath County now Del Norte County, California, United States. It was located on the Middle Fork of the Smith River, at an elevation of 899 feet (274 m). It still appeared on maps as of 1922.

References

External links

Former settlements in Del Norte County, California
Former populated places in California